Pandorea jasminoides, also known by the common names bower of beauty and bower vine, is a species of flowering plant in the family Bignoniaceae and is endemic to eastern Australia. It is a woody climber with pinnate leaves that have three to nine egg-shaped leaflets, and white or pink trumpet-shaped flowers that are red and hairy inside. It is also grown as an ornamental.

Description
Pandorea jasminoides is a woody climber with dark brown bark and glabrous stems.

The four stamens are enclosed in the petal tube.

Taxonomy
Bower of beauty was first formally described in 1837 by George Don, who gave it the name Tecoma jasminoides in his book, A General History of Dichlamydeous Plants. In 1894, Karl Moritz Schumann changed the name to Pandorea jasminoides in Die Natürlichen Pflanzenfamilien.

Distribution and habitat
Pandorea jasminoides grows in rainforest from central eastern Queensland to the  Hastings River in New South Wales with isolated occurrences further south in Kangaroo Valley and as far north as Mount Lewis National Park in far northern Queensland.

Use in horticulture
This climber can be propagated from seed, stem cuttings or by layering. Its vigorous growth makes it suitable for screening or climbing on pergolas and trellises, however it should not be planted near sewer pipes. The species has gained the Royal Horticultural Society's Award of Garden Merit.

Pandorea 'Lady Di', a cultivar with snow white, trumpet flowers is also a vigorous climber.

References

External links

jasminoides
Vines
Flora of Queensland
Lamiales of Australia
Flora of New South Wales
Garden plants of Australia
Taxa named by George Don
Plants described in 1837